{{DISPLAYTITLE:C17H14N2}}
The molecular formula C17H14N2 (molar mass: 246.31 g/mol, exact mass: 246.1157 u) may refer to:

 3,3'-Diindolylmethane (DIM)
 Ellipticine
 Olivacine

Molecular formulas